The Quality Improvement Agency (QIA) was a non-departmental public body of the United Kingdom government whose remit was to support those institutions that provide education, but which are not schools or universities. This covers a broad range of institutions, ranging from further education colleges, prison education to workplace training and various other types of education and training.

The QIA was created in March 2006 from the Learning and Skills Development Agency (LSDA). The majority of the assets and liabilities of the Quality Improvement Agency were transferred to the Learning and Skills Improvement Service, a new not for profit, sector owned improvement body for the Further Education sector on 1 October 2008.

Staff

There was one chair of trustees during the lifetime of QIA, Sir Geoffrey Holland.

The QIA had two chief executives - Andrew Thomson and Dr Kate Anderson.

References 

Article noting the passing of the QIA  http://webarchive.nationalarchives.gov.uk/20090504182734/lsis.org.uk/aboutus/welcome.aspx

External links

Defunct non-departmental public bodies of the United Kingdom government
Department for Business, Innovation and Skills
Further education colleges in the United Kingdom